41 Squadron or 41st Squadron may refer to:

 No. 41 Squadron RAF, a unit of the United Kingdom Royal Air Force
 No. 41 Squadron RAAF, a unit of the Royal Australian Air Force
 No. 41 Squadron RNZAF, a unit of the Royal New Zealand Air Force
 41 Squadron SAAF, a unit of the South African Air Force
 No. 41 Squadron (Finland), a unit of the Finnish Air Force
 41st Airlift Squadron, a unit of the United States Air Force
 Strike Fighter Squadron 41 (VFA-41), a unit of the United States Navy
 Marine Aviation Logistics Squadron 41, a unit of the United States Marine Corps

See also
 41st Battalion (disambiguation)
 41st Regiment (disambiguation)
 41st Brigade (disambiguation)
 41st Division (disambiguation)